Fucosidosis is a rare lysosomal storage disorder in which the FUCA1 gene experiences mutations that severely reduce or stop the activity of the alpha-L-fucosidase enzyme.  The result is a buildup of complex sugars in parts of the body, which leads to death.
Fucosidosis is one of nine identified glycoprotein storage diseases. The gene encoding the alpha-fucosidase, FUCA 1, was found to be located to the short arm of chromosome 1p36 - p34, by Carrit and co-workers, in 1982.

Cause
Fucosidosis is an autosomal recessive disorder that affects many areas of the body. Mutations in the FUCA1 gene causes fucosidosis. The FUCA1 gene provides instructions for making an enzyme called alpha-L-fucosidase. The enzyme plays a role in the breakdown of complex sugars in the body. The disorder is characterized by lysosomal accumulation of a variety of glycoproteins, glycolipids, and oligosaccharides that contain fucose moieties. The deficiency of the enzyme alpha-L-fucosidase, which is used to metabolize complex compounds in the body (fucose-containing glycolipids and fucose-containing glycoproteins). With the lack of this enzyme activity, the result is incomplete breakdown of glycolipids and glycoproteins. These partially broken down compounds accumulate in various parts of the body and begin to cause malfunction in cells,  and can eventually cause cell death. Brain cells are especially sensitive to this buildup. Other results are progressive neurological deterioration, skin abnormalities, growth retardation, skeletal disease, and coarsening of facial features. Fucosidosis is the consequence of faulty degradation of both sphingolipids and polysaccharides. Major accumulation of the H-antigen (a member of the ABO blood group antigens), a glycolipid, is seen primarily in the liver of fucosidosis patients.

Diagnosis

Diagnosis: A special urine test is available to check for any partially broken-down-sugars. If they are present, a skin or blood sample will be taken to test for below-normal amounts of alpha-fucosidase.

- Fucosidosis is an autosomal recessive disorder, which means that both parents have to have the mutation and pass it on to the child. When both parents have the mutation, there is a 25% chance of each child having fucosidosis.

Type 1
Type 1 usually begins somewhere in the first three to 18 months of age and in considered the most severe of the three types. Symptoms include:

 Coarse facial features
 Enlarged liver, spleen, and/or heart
 Intellectual disability
 Seizures
 Abnormal bone formation of many bones
 Progressive deterioration of brain and spinal cord
 Increased or decreased perspiration

Patients have no vascular lesions, but have rapid psychomotor regression, severe and rapidly progressing neurologic signs, elevated sodium and chloride excretion in the sweat, and fatal outcome before the sixth year.

Type 2
Type 2 appears when a child is around 18 months of age and in considered milder than Type 1 but still severe. Symptoms include:
 Symptoms similar to Type 1 but milder and progress more slowly.

Type 3
Type 3 appears around 1–2 years of age and is considered mild.

Treatment
Treatment: There is no treatment or way to reverse the disease. Treatment will focus on the symptoms an individual has, such as seizure medication.

 It is possible that if an individual receives a bone marrow transplant, they could receive healthy bone marrow cells which would produce normal amounts of fucosidase. But there not is enough research to prove this is an effective treatment.

History
Fucosidosis is an extremely rare disorder first described in 1962 in two Italian siblings who showed progressive intellectual disability and neurological deterioration. The disease itself is extremely rare (less than 100 documented cases) only affecting 1:2,000,000, with most cases being occurring in Italy, Cuba, and the southwest U.S. The disease has three different types. Type 1 and 2 are considered severe, and Type 3 being a mild disease. Symptoms are highly variable with mild cases being able to live to within the third or fourth decade. Type 1 and 2 are both linked with mental retardation. Severe cases can develop life-threatening complications early in childhood.
Because the major accumulating glycoconjugate in fucosidosis patients is the blood group H-antigen, it is intriguing to speculate, but the evidence is not clear at this time, that blood type may affect the course of the disease.

Other forms
Canine fucosidosis is found in the English Springer Spaniel.

Typically affecting dogs between 18 months and four years, symptoms include:
 Loss of learned behavior
 Change in temperament
 Blindness
 Loss of balance
 Deafness
 Weight loss
 From the onset, disease progress is quick and fatal.
Just like the human version, canine fucosidosis is a recessive disorder and two copies of the gene must be present, one from each parent, in order to show symptoms of the disease.

See also 
 Sialidosis

References

External links 

 http://www.rarediseases.org/rare-disease-information/rare-diseases/byID/1095/viewAbstract - Rare diseases.org

Rare diseases
Autosomal recessive disorders
Glycoprotein metabolism disorders
Skin conditions resulting from errors in metabolism